Abraham of Lerida was a Jewish physician, surgeon and astrologer. On September 12, 1468, he couched a cataract in the right eye of King John II of Aragon, and afterward was equally successful with the left eye.

References
 

15th-century Aragonese Jews
15th-century Spanish physicians
Medieval Jewish physicians of Spain